Dorian Coninx (born 28 January 1994) is a French triathlete. He competed in the men's event at the 2016 Summer Olympics.

Triathlon career
Coninx won both the Junior European and Junior World Championship in 2013. He then won the U23 World title in 2014.

In winter 2015, he ran a  10k at the Cannes 10k, and went on to win his first international Elite race at the Quarteira European Cup event later in the year.

In 2017, he became French Elite Champion on Sprint Distance. In 2019, he won the bronze medal in the men's triathlon at the 2019 Military World Games held in Wuhan, China.

Coninx has also competed at Super League Triathlon events. He finished in second place at SLT Toulouse 2022. The first Super League Triathlon event to be held in France.

References

External links
 

1994 births
Living people
French male triathletes
Olympic triathletes of France
Triathletes at the 2016 Summer Olympics
People from Échirolles
Sportspeople from Isère
Triathletes at the 2020 Summer Olympics
Medalists at the 2020 Summer Olympics
Olympic bronze medalists for France
Olympic medalists in triathlon